Meat glue is a substance used in cooking to bond proteins together. It includes substances such as transglutaminase and fibrinogen/thrombin. Examples of foods made using meat glue include imitation crab meat, and sometimes fish balls and chicken nuggets.

Transglutaminase works by binding protein molecules together at their glutamyl and lysyl residues.

Fibrinogen/thrombin (sold under the brand name Fibrimex) are two blood-clotting proteins. Fibrinogen is activated by thrombin into a fibrin network, in a way analogous to fibrin glue found in surgical use.

Meat glue has found use among practitioners of the molecular gastronomy movement, as a means of melding new textures with existing tastes.

References

External links
 Meat glue news video on Today Tonight (an Australian current affairs program) also hosted on YouTube.
 

Food additives